Karen Faith Berman is an American psychiatrist and physician-scientist who is a senior investigator and chief of the section on integrative neuroimaging, the psychosis and cognitive studies section, and the clinical and translational neuroscience branch of the National Institute of Mental Health's division of intramural research.

Life 
Berman received a B.S. degree from the University of Rochester and a M.D. from Saint Louis University School of Medicine. She completed her medical internship at Washington University in St. Louis and had residency training in psychiatry at the University of California, San Diego. Berman also completed residency training in nuclear medicine at the National Institutes of Health Clinical Center and is board certified in both psychiatry and nuclear medicine.  

She is a senior investigator and chief of the section on integrative neuroimaging, the psychosis and cognitive studies section, and the clinical and translational neuroscience branch of the National Institute of Mental Health's (NIMH) division of intramural research. Berman's group uses functional neuroimaging to map brain activity and neurochemical mechanisms associated with normal higher cognitive function as well as dysfunction in neuropsychiatric illnesses such as schizophrenia, illnesses having genetic sources of cognitive dysfunction such as Williams syndrome, and other conditions impacting cognition such as normal aging. They also study the effects of gonadal steroid hormones on brain function. In 2016, Berman was elected to the National Academy of Medicine.

References 

Living people
Year of birth missing (living people)
Place of birth missing (living people)
University of Rochester alumni
Saint Louis University alumni
National Institutes of Health people
Members of the National Academy of Medicine
21st-century American women physicians
21st-century American physicians
American psychiatrists
American women psychiatrists
American medical researchers
Women medical researchers
Physician-scientists